The team jumping event, part of the equestrian program at the 1996 Summer Olympics was held on 31 July and 1 August 1996 at the Georgia International Horse Park in Conyers, Georgia. The results of the second and third round of the individual jumping were used to award rankings.  Like all other equestrian events, the competition was mixed gender, with both male and female athletes competing in the same division.  Fourteen teams, each consisting of four horse and rider pairs, entered the contest.

Medalists

Results

Round 1
Each team consisted of four pairs of horse and rider.  The penalty points of the lowest three pairs were added together to reach the team's penalty points.

Round 2
Each team consisted of four pairs of horse and rider.  The penalty points of the lowest three pairs were added together to reach the team's penalty points.

Final standings

Note: Argentina originally finished 17th, but were disqualified after FEI officials discovered that, prior to coming to the Olympics, they had forced their horses to practice by jumping over obstacles topped with barbed wire and nails.

References

Source: Official Report of the 1996 Atlanta Summer Olympics available at  https://web.archive.org/web/20060622162855/http://www.la84foundation.org/5va/reports_frmst.htm

Equestrian at the 1996 Summer Olympics